The Eduardo Arozamena Medal,, is an accolade bestowed by the National Association of Actors to honor actors who have contributed fifty years to the industry of Mexican cinema. Another familiar prize called the Virginia Fábregas Medal awards actors who have twenty-five years.

The medal was originally instituted by singer-actor Jorge Negrete, who was the association's secretary-general in 1951, and who wanted to honor the memory of actor Eduardo Arozamena who died that same year.

List of Eduardo Arozamena Medal winners

1968
María Tereza Montoya.

2001
On November 14, 2001; the association held a ceremony in the Teatro Jorge Negrete. It was hosted by Jacqueline Andere and Ricardo Blume. 
José Luis Aarón 
Luis Moya 
Nora Gatica 
Fernando Casanova  
Flor Silvestre 
Antonio Aguilar

References

Mexican film awards